Dillon Stith (born February 20, 1992) is an American professional basketball player for the Waverley Falcons of the NBL1 South. He played college basketball for Saint Vincent College before moving to Australia in 2015 to play in the Big V. After one season with the Melbourne Tigers, he played four seasons for the McKinnon Cougars between 2016 and 2019, winning Big V MVPs in 2017 and 2019 and leading the Cougars to the championship in 2019. He also made his NBL debut with Melbourne United in 2019.

Early life
Stith was born in Bedford, Virginia. He attended Liberty High School in Bealeton, Virginia, where he was a two-time letterman and Senior Captain while earning First Team All-District and Second Team All-Area honors.

College career
Stith played four seasons of college basketball for the Saint Vincent College Bearcats in the NCAA Division III between 2010 and 2014. As a freshman in 2010–11, he appeared in all 27 games and made one start while averaging 5.2 points and 3.7 rebounds per game. As a sophomore in 2011–12, he appeared in all 27 games with 13 starts and averaged 9.8 points and a team-leading 5.6 rebounds per game. He also blocked a team-high 35 shots. As a junior in 2012–13, he was named to All-PAC Second Team after averaging 11.7 points and 5.2 rebounds per game. He appeared in all 29 games with 14 starts. As a senior in 2013–14, he was named the PAC Player of the Year after being the only player in the conference to average a double-double with 19.5 points and 10.2 rebounds per game.

Professional career
Stith arrived in Australia after trying out for a tour team in Indianapolis, Indiana. After successfully making the tour team and playing well in front of the Australian teams, he was offered a contract to play for the Melbourne Tigers of the Big V by National Basketball League (NBL) legend Andrew Gaze. In the 2015 Big V season, Stith averaged 22.3 points and 10.2 rebounds per game and earned Big V All-Star Five honors.

For the 2016 Big V season, Stith joined the McKinnon Cougars. He averaged 21.8 points and 7.1 rebounds per game.

In November 2016, Stith moved to Ireland to play for Belfast Star in the Super League. He was named Player of the Month for December. He left the team in February 2017. He was named to the league's All-Star Second Team for the 2016–17 season and was the league's scoring champion with 27.4 points per game.

Stith returned to the McKinnon Cougars for the 2017 season. He was named co-MVP of the Big V and earned All-Star Five honors.

In October 2017, Stith travelled with NBL team Melbourne United to the United States for their NBA preseason exhibition game against the Oklahoma City Thunder.

With the Cougars in 2018, Stith was again named to the All-Star Five while averaging 19.96 points per game. In 2019, he led the Cougars to the grand final series where they defeated the Hume City Broncos 2–0 to win the championship. He had 37 points and 14 rebounds in the game two victory. He averaged 26.5 points and 11.2 rebounds for the season while earning league MVP honors and All-Star Five.

In October 2019, Stith joined the roster of Melbourne United as an injury replacement for Casey Prather. He made his NBL debut on October 3 against the South East Melbourne Phoenix. He travelled to the United States with Melbourne later that month to play two NBA preseason games. As a result of an injury setback to Prather in both November and December, Stith remained in the line-up. In eight games during the 2019–20 NBL season, Stith averaged 2.0 points per game.

Stith had signed with the Knox Raiders for the 2020 NBL1 season, but the season was cancelled due to the COVID-19 pandemic.

In February 2021, Stith re-joined Melbourne United as an injury replacement. In April 2021, he debuted for the Frankston Blues in the NBL1 South season. He scored double digits in all fifteen games for the Blues while averaging 22.1 points and 8.7 rebounds per game.

In February 2022, Stith re-signed with the Frankston Blues. In 24 games, he averaged 15.83 points, 6.83 rebounds, 1.54 assists and 1.17 steals per game.

In October 2022, Stith signed with the Waverley Falcons for the 2023 NBL South season.

Personal life
Stith's older brother, Jeff Mallory, also played professional basketball.

References

External links
NBL1 profile
NBL profile
College bio

1992 births
Living people
American expatriate basketball people in Australia
American expatriate basketball people in Ireland
American men's basketball players
Basketball players from Virginia
Melbourne United players
Power forwards (basketball)
Saint Vincent College alumni